Domagoj Vida (born 29 April 1989) is a Croatian professional footballer who plays as a defender for Super League Greece club AEK Athens and the Croatia national team. He is capable of playing in any defensive position but is mostly deployed as a centre-back or a right-back.

Club career

Youth career
Vida has spent his entire youth career in Croatia, rising through the Osijek youth system and being first featured with the senior team in the 2006–07 season, at the age of 17; he then went on to make 12 appearances in the season. In the 2007–08 season, Vida further solidified his credentials, being featured more regularly for his club. He was linked with Croatian champions Dinamo Zagreb.

Bayer Leverkusen
On 29 April 2010, Vida signed for German Bundesliga side Bayer Leverkusen. He spent just one season with the club, making a total of eight appearances in the UEFA Europa League. He did not make his Bundesliga debut until 5 March 2011, when he came on as a substitute for the injured Manuel Friedrich in the 14th minute of a 3–0 win at home to VfL Wolfsburg. It turned out to be his only appearance in the league.

Dinamo Zagreb
On 14 June 2011, it was announced that Vida would join Dinamo Zagreb for an undisclosed fee. In December 2011, Dinamo Zagreb lost 7–1 against Lyon in the Champions League group stage which allowed the French club to progress to the last 16 of the Champions League at the expense of Ajax, who lost 3–0 against Real Madrid. Following media coverage alleging match-fixing which also showed clips of Vida winking after Lyon's fifth goal, UEFA decided not to take action.

On 25 July 2012, Vida scored a 98th–minute goal against Bulgarian side Ludogorets Razgrad in a UEFA Champions League match and thus helped his team to a 3–2 home win, which enabled it to progress to the competition's next round. On 24 September 2012, he was thrown out of the first team and the team bus after he opened up a beer while the team were on their way to a cup match. He also had several altercations with Dinamo head coach Ante Čačić prior to this incident. The next day, it was announced that he would be fined a record €100,000.

Dynamo Kyiv

On 2 January 2013, it was announced that Vida had signed for Ukrainian club Dynamo Kyiv on a five–year deal, for a reported transfer fee of €6 million. On 14 February, he made his debut for Dynamo in a home Europa League match against Bordeaux, which ended 1–1. A week later, he played in the tie's second leg and was unable to help Dynamo get to the round of 16, losing 0–1. In both games, Dynamo head coach Oleh Blokhin used him as a right–back.

On 3 March, Vida played his first game in the Ukrainian Premier League, against Kryvbas Kryvyi Rih. The home 1–1 draw was disappointing for Dynamo, as it made much more difficult for them to get second place and qualify for the Champions League against Dnipro Dnipropetrovsk and Metalist Kharkiv. On 10 March, Vida played his second league match for Dynamo, against Volyn Lutsk; it ended 2–0 and was Dynamo's first victory in 2013. That match was notable because Oleh Blokhin used Vida for the first time as a central defender, partnered with Yevhen Khacheridi, as the first three games for Dynamo he played as a right defender. On 17 March, Vida scored his first goal for Dynamo early in the game against Vorskla Poltava after a corner kick taken by Andriy Yarmolenko, by an excellent header, having forestalled Pavlo Rebenok and goalkeeper Serhiy Dolhanskyi. That goal gave Dynamo a 1–0 win.

On 17 May 2015, Vida scored the winning goal against Dnipro Dnipropetrovsk to clinch Dynamo Kyiv their first Ukrainian Premier League title in six years.

Beşiktaş
On 3 January 2018, Vida moved to Beşiktaş, signing a four-and-a-half-year contract. Vida made his Beşiktaş debut on 21 February 2018, in a 2–1 away win over Antalyaspor. Vida was sent off 16 minutes into his club's UEFA Champions League round of 16 match against Bayern Munich after he fouled Robert Lewandowski. Beşiktaş went on to lose the match 5–0.

AEK Athens
On 31 July 2022, Vida signed for Greek club AEK Athens.

International career

Vida was an active member of the Croatia national under-21 team.

On 23 May 2010, he made his full international debut in Croatia's 2–0 win against Wales in Osijek, entering as a substitute for Darijo Srna in the 80th minute. Three days later, he played the full 90 minutes in a goalless draw with Estonia.

In 2011, he featured for Croatia in four UEFA Euro 2012 qualifiers, including both play-off matches against Turkey, which saw them securing a place in the finals. His only appearance at the finals came when he was in the starting lineup for Croatia's final group match, a 1–0 defeat to Spain, after which they were eliminated from the tournament.

On 10 September 2013, Vida scored his first goal for the national side in the 65th minute of a friendly match against South Korea, played at the Jeonju World Cup Stadium in Jeonju.

Vida was a part of the Croatian squad at the 2014 FIFA World Cup tournament in Brazil, but remained as an unused substitute in the tournament. He regained his place as a regular during the UEFA Euro 2016 qualifying, making nine appearances, and also appeared in three matches at the finals, where the team were eliminated by Portugal in the round of 16.

On 3 September 2017, Vida scored the only goal in a 1–0 victory over Kosovo in the World Cup qualification.

In June 2018, he was named in Croatia's final 23-man squad for the 2018 FIFA World Cup in Russia. Vida scored a header in the quarter-final against hosts Russia to give his side a 2–1 lead in extra time. The match finished 2–2, Vida converted his spot kick in the penalty shootout to help his side advance. In the final, he took a free kick from Luka Modrić to setup Ivan Perišić for Croatia's first goal of the match, and picked up a runners-up medal as France eventually defeated his side 4–2.

On 15 October 2018, he captained the national team for the first time and scored in a 2–1 friendly win over Jordan.

On 11 November 2020, he captained the national team once again in a friendly 3–3 draw with Turkey, being at fault for Turkey's first two goals. The same night, after the game, he tested positive for COVID-19 and was left to self-isolate in Istanbul.

On 9 November 2022, Vida was named in Croatia's final 26-man squad for the 2022 FIFA World Cup, where he remained an unused substitute as Croatia finished third. On 16 November 2022, he played his 100th match for Croatia in a friendly match against Saudi Arabia.

Controversy
Vida and Ognjen Vukojević celebrated Croatia's World Cup victory over Russia by shouting "Glory to Ukraine!", a common slogan in Ukraine. FIFA's disciplinary code prohibits political, nationalist and racist slogans in any form. Vida later said: "I like Russian people. It was just a joke." Following Croatia's victory over 2018 World Cup hosts Russia in the quarter-finals, Vida, celebrating the victory with former Croatian international and current assistant coach, Ivica Olić, was recorded saying "Belgrade is burning!" in Croatian. Later it turned out Belgrade was the name of the tavern in Kyiv where they used to hang out. Aleksandar Holiga, editor of Croatian website Telesport, has largely downplayed the incident saying "I don't think Vida understood the full meaning and context of what he was saying. Both of them were just doing it because they are close to Dynamo Kyiv. It's something that fans would chant" and that "politically, Croatia doesn't have a perfect relationship with Russia, but then who does in the rest of Europe?" BBC reported that "Ukrainians accused FIFA of siding with Russia and flooded the football body's Facebook page with declarations of 'Glory to Ukraine'." On 11 July, in an interview in Russian with Russia 24, Vida said that he was mistaken and apologized to Russian people.

Personal life
Domagoj Vida was born in Našice, but grew up in Donji Miholjac in the family of Željka Ursanić and former footballer Rudika Vida.

In 2015, Vida and his fiancee Ivana Gugić welcomed their first child, a baby boy they named David. Vida and Gugić married in Umag in June 2017.

Career statistics

Club

International

Scores and results list Croatia's goal tally first, score column indicates score after each Vida goal

Honours
Dinamo Zagreb
Prva HNL: 2011–12, 2012–13
Croatian Cup: 2011–12

Dynamo Kyiv
Ukrainian Premier League: 2014–15, 2015–16
Ukrainian Cup: 2013–14, 2014–15
Ukrainian Super Cup: 2016

Beşiktaş
Süper Lig: 2020–21
Turkish Cup: 2020–21
Turkish Super Cup: 2021

Croatia
FIFA World Cup runner-up: 2018; third place: 2022

Orders
Order of Duke Branimir: 2018

Individual
List of 33 Top Players of the Ukrainian Premier League: 2016–17
Süper Lig Team of the Year: 2018–19

References

External links
 

1989 births
Living people
People from Donji Miholjac
Croatian footballers
Association football defenders
NK Osijek players
Bayer 04 Leverkusen players
GNK Dinamo Zagreb players
FC Dynamo Kyiv players
Beşiktaş J.K. footballers
AEK Athens F.C. players
Croatian Football League players
Bundesliga players
Ukrainian Premier League players
Süper Lig players
Super League Greece players
Croatia youth international footballers
Croatia under-21 international footballers
Croatia international footballers
UEFA Euro 2012 players
2014 FIFA World Cup players
UEFA Euro 2016 players
2018 FIFA World Cup players
UEFA Euro 2020 players
2022 FIFA World Cup players
Croatian expatriate footballers
Expatriate footballers in Germany
Expatriate footballers in Turkey
Expatriate footballers in Ukraine
Expatriate footballers in Greece
Croatian expatriate sportspeople in Germany
Croatian expatriate sportspeople in Turkey
Croatian expatriate sportspeople in Ukraine
Croatian expatriate sportspeople in Greece
FIFA Century Club